The Great Merchant (lit. Merchant Kim Man-deok) is a 2010 South Korean historical drama starring Lee Mi-yeon, Han Jae-suk, Park Sol-mi, Ha Seok-jin, and Go Doo-shim. It aired on KBS1 from March 6 to June 13, 2010 on Saturdays and Sundays at 20:40 for 30 episodes.

The series follows the life of Kim Man-deok (1739-1812). Kim was born on Jeju Island. Adopted by the head of a gisaeng house at the age of 12, she became a government gisaeng ― a type of Korean traditional entertainer who is designated and reserved specifically for government officials. After discovering a talent in business and commerce, she later became one of the most successful female merchants on the island.

When Jeju was struck by a deadly famine in 1795 (the 19th year of  King Jeongjo, Kim sold all her assets and donated approximately 90% of her money (approximated to be  in today's currency) to save millions of lives. Kim was later praised by numerous scholars and philosophers, which was notable given her background as a gisaeng and the fact that she saved the people of Jeju Island, a place that was considered a place of exile at the time. Kim's heroic deeds were documented in Jeongjo Sillok ("The Annals of King Jeongjo") in 1796, and was even featured as a folktale called Mandeok-jeon ("The Story of Man-deok").  In 1978,  a memorial was created for Kim Man-deok on Jeju Island, and annually Jeju Island presents the "Man-deok Award" to two outstanding women in philanthropy.

The drama features Kim's life and achievements, along with her ongoing rivalry with fellow merchants during the Joseon Dynasty.

This is the second of the "noblesse oblige" series produced by KBS in 2010, after The Reputable Family. The third and last part of the series was Freedom Fighter, Lee Hoe-young, which aired on the anniversary of the centenary of the Forced Annexation of Korea by Japan in 2010.

Synopsis
Kim Man-deok was born into the noble class—her mother was a haenyeo of Jeju Island; her father was a high-ranking government official who met Kim's mother during the time he was exiled on Jeju Island.  Kim's biological mother, Yi Eun Hong, does not tell her father, Kim Eung Ryul, about her pregnancy, as he and his clan could be punished by execution for inappropriate conduct during his exile. At birth, Kim is named Yi Hong.  Her mother dies soon after her birth, leaving her daughter a flute that would one day help her reconnect to her father.

Kim is adopted by Madame Kim, a former palace lady, but who is known to Kim as "Hal-mae" (translated as "Granny").  Managing a training center in Hanyang for orphaned children, Hal-mae teaches the children marketplace skills and trades necessary for them to become successful in the future.  During her time with the training center, Kim meets Jung Hong Soo, the son of high-ranking politician, Lord Jung Do-woong.  Ill-fated circumstances causes Granny, Dong Ah, and Kim (who is now 12 years old) to run for their lives, forcing them to leave Hanyang and head to Jeju Island.  In the process, they find the need to separate but agree to meet in Jeju. Kim is the first to arrive on Jeju Island.  Dong Ah finds her, but the two are soon in trouble and they find themselves jailed after an altercation with young Kang Yoo-ji, the later Foreman of West Gate Market Brokers.  To keep Dong Ah from undergoing torture, Kim is tricked into agreeing to become the foster daughter of the head gisaeng on Jeju Island.  Rather than leave Kim, Dong Ah agrees to become her servant and protector.

Seven years later, Hal-mae finally arrives on Jeju Island and is reunited with Kim and Dong Ah. While Hal-mae tries to get Kim removed from the gisaeng registry, she finds that Kim's gisaeng foster mother and the Assistant Magistrate killed Yi Eun Hong, Kim's mother.  To avoid public exposure of their misdeeds, they plot to frame Hal-mae and Kim as if the two were trying to escape the island.  Hal-mae learns of the plot and in the process of finding Kim, the two are "caught".  Hal-mae is confined in jail, while Kim is sent to the transitory wards (or quarantine camp) for epidemics as punishment. After being rescued from the camp, Kim begins to take care of those in the camp who are suffering from illness.  During this time, Kim's father visits the island and discovers the birth of his daughter.  Although he cannot publicly acknowledge her as his daughter, he gives her written documentation of her birth registry and bestows upon her the name, Kim Man-deok.

Later, Kim reestablishes East Gate Market Brokers, going into the business of importing and exporting goods between Jeju Island and the Korean mainland, and begins the process of restoring business ethics in Jeju.  Kim's former childhood friend, Oh Moon-seon feels a sense of inferiority and underhandedly competes with her as head of West Gate Market Brokers.  Man-deok's high standards and business ethics cause her business to thrive, while Madame Oh's jealousy and resentment of Kim, as well as her greed for wealth and power, eventually lead to her demise.

Transcending her lowly status as a gisaeng, as well as the restraints of her birthplace (Jeju Island was considered to be a remote place of exile during that time period), Kim Man-deok becomes the most successful female merchant of the Joseon Dynasty and one of the richest people on Jeju Island. A severe famine strikes Jeju Island in 1795, obliterating one-third of its population. Man-deok sells all her assets to help feed the starving people of her island, saving countless lives.  In 1796, Kim travels to  Hanyang (modern day, Seoul) to meet King Jeongjo, who bestows upon her the honorary title and position, Female Physician of the Palace Dispensary, as reward for her benevolous deeds.

Cast
 Lee Mi-yeon as Kim Man-deok/Yi Hong 
 Shim Eun-kyung as Hong (young Yi Hong) 
Daughter of Lord Kim Eung-ryul and Yi Eun-hong, a commoner from Jeju Island.
 Han Jae-suk as Jung Hong-soo 
 Do Ji-han as young Hong-soo 
Son of Lord Jung Do-woong; Assistant Section Chief of Board of Punishments; formerly Captain of Commerce Control Bureau.
 Park Sol-mi as Oh Moon-seon, "Madam Oh"
 Joo Da-young as Mak-soon (young Moon-seon)
Stepmother of Kang Yoo-ji; owner of West Gate Market Brokers.
 Ha Seok-jin as Kang Yoo-ji
Stepson of Oh Moon-seon; Foreman, West Gate Market Brokers.
 Go Doo-shim as Hal-mae, "Granny" 
Formerly Palace Matron Kim.
 Kim Cheol-ki as Dong-ah 
 Lee Mi-ji as Deok-pal's mother 
 Lee Byung-wook as Kim Pan-sool
Junior Foreman of East Gate.
 Kim Kap-soo as Kang Kye-man 
 Kim Myung-kook as Choi Nam-gu
Assistant Magistrate
 Kim Kyu-chul as Steward Oh 
 Lee Dal-hyung as Kim Dong-joo 
 Kim Sun-kyung as Myo-hyang 
 Shim Eun-jin as Yo-hwa
Gisaeng.
 Jo Yang-ja as Chok-sae's mother
Cook at gisaeng house.
 Park Soon-chun as Yeong Cheon-daek 
 Choi Jae-sung as Lord Kim Eung-ryul
Father of Kim Man-deok; Inspector, Commerce Control Bureau.
 Kim Byung-ki as Lord Jung Do-woong
Father of Jung Hong-soo; Minister, Board of Punishments.
 Choo So-young as Eun-hong 
 Lee Deok-hee as Jung Hong-soo's mother 
 Song Yong-tae as Go Seok-joo
Senior Foreman, East Gate Market Brokers.
 Jeon Ye-seo as Baek Jo-rye 
 Jo Jae-wan as Deok-pal 
 Oh Yeon-seo as Lee Eun 
 Jung Soo-young as Kim Seo-joo 
 Jo Byung-gi as Lee Bang 
 Jung Jong-joon as Mu Maeng-dal
Loan shark.
 Jung Joo-hee as Holjjugi 
 Kang Min-suk as Chil-bok 
 Maeng Ho-rim as Minister Chae 
 Yoo Yeon-mi as Kkot-nim 
 Kim Sung-hoon as Wal-pae 
 Im Hyuk
 Lee Jooyeon
 ? as Chief Clerk Kang
 ? as Captain Hwang
 ? as merchant seeking deer antlers at East Gate
 ? as Skipper Jang
 ? as cook
 ? as black cow rancher

References

External links
  
 
 

Korean Broadcasting System television dramas
Television series set in the Joseon dynasty
2010 South Korean television series debuts
2010 South Korean television series endings
Korean-language television shows
Television shows set in Jeju Province
South Korean historical television series